Stepan Agabekovich Kevorkov was a Soviet and Armenian actor and film director. People's Artist of the USSR (1970).

Biography 
Kevorkov studied at the State Film College in Moscow, graduating in 1930. At Azerkino studio in Baku, he assisted Nikoloz Shengelaia on the stylish Twenty-six Commissars and later, at Mosfilm Studio, he was an assistant to Aleksandr Dovzhenko on Aerograd (1935). At Armenfilm Studio, Kevorkov worked as an assistant director for Hamo Bek-Nazaryan on The Girl from Ararat valley (1949), in which he also played the supporting role of Tatos. Kevorkov's first picture was The Mountain March 1939 co-directed with Erazam Karamyan.

Kevorkov and Karamyan continued the saga with An Extraordinary Assignment (1965). Kevorkov co-directed the third installment,'' The Last Deed of Kamo (1974), with Grigori Melik-Avakyan.

Kevorkov, Who joined the Communist Part in 1945, was named People's Artist of the USSR in 1970. He served as executive director of Armenfilm Studio in 1949-1951 and first secretary of the Armenian Filmmakers' Union 1956 to 1964.

Filmography

References

External links

1903 births
1991 deaths
20th-century Armenian male actors
Male actors from Moscow
Communist Party of the Soviet Union members
Gerasimov Institute of Cinematography alumni
People's Artists of Armenia
People's Artists of the USSR
Recipients of the Order of the Red Banner of Labour
Armenian film directors
Armenian male film actors
Soviet Armenians
Soviet film directors
Soviet male film actors